Oxford is an unincorporated community in on the Southern Ute Indian Reservation in La Plata County, Colorado, United States.

History
The townsite map was recorded November 3, 1909 by The Oxford Land and Townsite Co. alongside the Denver & Rio Grande RR by J.M. Denning. 
A post office called Oxford was established in 1908, and remained in operation until 1954. The name Oxford was selected on account of its euphonic sound, according to local history.

See also

References

External link

Unincorporated communities in La Plata County, Colorado
Unincorporated communities in Colorado